The Woman Haters is a 1913 American short silent comedy film featuring Roscoe 'Fatty' Arbuckle.

Cast
 Roscoe 'Fatty' Arbuckle
 Nick Cogley

See also
 Fatty Arbuckle filmography

References

External links

1913 films
1913 comedy films
Silent American comedy films
1913 short films
American silent short films
American black-and-white films
Films directed by Henry Lehrman
American comedy short films
1910s American films